In the field of international relations, the Three Worlds Theory by Mao Zedong proposed to the visiting Algerian President Houari Boumédiène in February 1974 that the international system operated as three contradictory politico-economic worlds. On April 10, 1974, at the 6th Special Session United Nations General Assembly, Vice-Premier Deng Xiaoping applied the Three Worlds Theory during the New International Economic Order presentations about the problems of raw materials and development, to explain the PRC's economic co-operation with non-communist countries.

The First World comprises the United States and the Soviet Union, the superpower countries. The Second World comprises Japan, Canada, Europe and the other countries of the global North. The Third World comprises China, India, the countries of Africa, Latin America, and continental Asia.

As political science, the Three Worlds Theory is a Maoist interpretation and geopolitical reformulation of international relations, which is different from the Three-World Model, created by the demographer Alfred Sauvy in which the First World comprises the United States, the United Kingdom, and their allies; the Second World comprises the Soviet Union, the People's Republic of China, and their allies; and the Third World comprises the economically underdeveloped countries, including the 120 countries of the Non-Aligned Movement (NAM).

Criticism
In the 1970s, the Party of Labour of Albania led by Enver Hoxha began to openly criticize the Three Worlds Theory, describing it as anti-Leninist and a chauvinist theory. The publication of these works and the now active criticism of the Three Worlds Theory in Albanian media played a hand in the growing ideological divide between Albania and China that would ultimately culminate in Albania denouncing the People's Republic of China and Maoism as revisionist.

See also 
Africa–China relations
World-systems theory
Third-Worldism
Third World socialism
Maoism–Third Worldism
First World
Second World
Third World
Fourth World
Developed country
Developing country
Anti-revisionism

References

External links
 On the Question of the Differentiation of the Three Worlds
 Communist Party of China – The letter in 25 points
 Renmin Ribao on the Three Worlds Theory
 Speech by Deng Xiaoping at the Special Session of the U.N. General Assembly
 Enver Hoxha: Imperialism and the Revolution – Part Two
 Communist Party of Peru on the three worlds
 Communist Party of Turkey/Marxist-Leninist on the three worlds
 Red Army Fraction: statement made on November 1972

Ideology of the Chinese Communist Party
Maoism
Country classifications
Imperialism studies